Pere may refer to:

Pere, Hungary, a village in Borsod-Abaúj-Zemplén county
Rangimārie Te Turuki Arikirangi Rose Pere (1937–2020), Māori New Zealand educationalist and spiritual leader
Wi Pere (1837–1915), a Māori Member of Parliament in New Zealand
Pere Wihongi

See also 
 Péré (disambiguation)